This Place Is Painted Red is the first album released by indie rock band Deas Vail. The album was self-released in 2005.

Track listing
 "A Lover's Charm"
 "Anything You Say"
 "Life as a Breath"
 "Hope in Fallen Strangers"
 "This Place Is Painted Red"
 "Chrysalis"
 "All of Me For All of You"
 "Higher in Your Ways"
 "When We're Alone"
 "Before Midnight"
 "Follow Sound"

2005 albums
Deas Vail albums